The 2015 Pan American Road Cycling Championships took place at León, Guanajuato, Mexico, May 7–10, 2015.

Medal summary

Men

Women

Under 23 Men

Results

Men elite road race

Men elite individual time trial

Women road race

Women time trial

Under 23 Men road race

Under 23 Men time trial

Notes

References

Americas
Cycling
Pan American Road and Track Championships
International cycle races hosted by Mexico
May 2015 sports events in Mexico